Women's Christian Hospital, Multan, commonly known as Mission Hospital Multan, is an oldest women's hospital located in Multan, Punjab, Pakistan.

History
It was established in 1899 by the Church Missionary Society.

In 1935, a maternity facility and labor rooms were created, as well as a nurse training school. The C.M.S. sold the 100-bed hospital to the Women's Union Missionary Society (WUMS) on October 1, 1956. WUMS was then registered with the Government of Pakistan and is still operating under the name WUMS.

In 1978, the hospital's concentration shifted to obstetrics, gynecology, and pediatrics alone.

References

External links 
 Official website

Hospitals in Multan
1899 establishments in British India
Christian hospitals